Adin Parsons Hobart (1822–1881) was a member of the Wisconsin State Assembly during the 1872 session, succeeding Democrat Valentin Knœll. Additionally, he was Postmaster of Oak Creek, Wisconsin. Hobart was a Republican.

Hobart was born on March 15, 1822, in Homer, New York. He died on June 14, 1881, and was buried in South Milwaukee.

References

1822 births
1881 deaths
People from Homer, New York
People from Oak Creek, Wisconsin
Wisconsin postmasters
Republican Party members of the Wisconsin State Assembly
19th-century American politicians